The Awakening is the third and final album by the hip hop artist Lord Finesse, released in 1996. Unlike his first two albums, The Awakening features a large number of album guests, including Doo-Wop, O.C., KRS-One, MC Lyte, Marquee, Akinyele, Showbiz, Diamond D, A.G., Kid Capri, Large Professor and Brand Nubian's Grand Puba and Sadat X. The album features the single "Hip 2 Da Game" and the hidden track "Actual Facts".

Music videos
There have been music videos for the tracks "Hip 2 Da Game", "Actual Facts" & "Gameplan". Gameplan features a cameo from Big L.

Big L appears during the chorus for “Food for Thought”

Track listing

Note: "Actual Facts" is not listed anywhere on the jacket on CD or vinyl editions; the track was listed as a "bonus track" on a promotional sticker on the cover. The vinyl edition places the track after "Gameplan".

Charts
Album

Singles

References

Lord Finesse albums
1996 albums
Albums produced by Lord Finesse